Home Children was the child migration scheme founded by Annie MacPherson in 1869, under which more than 100,000 children were sent from the United Kingdom to Australia, Canada, New Zealand, and South Africa. The programme was largely discontinued in the 1930s, but not entirely terminated until the 1970s.

Later research, beginning in the 1980s, exposed abuse and hardships of the relocated children. Australia apologised in 2009 for its involvement in the scheme. In February 2010 UK Prime Minister Gordon Brown made a formal apology to the families of children who suffered. Canadian Immigration Minister Jason Kenney stated in 2009 that Canada would not apologise to child migrants, preferring to "recognize that sad period" in other ways.

History

As a labour source
The practice of sending poor or orphaned children to English and later British colonies, to help alleviate the shortage of labour, began in 1618, with the rounding-up and transportation of one hundred English vagrant children to the Virginia Colony. In the 18th century, labour shortages in the overseas colonies also encouraged the transportation of children for work in the Americas, and large numbers of children were forced to migrate, most of them from Scotland. This practice continued until it was exposed in 1757, following a civil action against Aberdeen merchants and magistrates for their involvement in the trade.

Philanthropic efforts
The Children's Friend Society was founded in London in 1830 as "The Society for the Suppression of Juvenile Vagrancy through the reformation and emigration of children." In 1832, the first group of children was sent to the Cape Colony in South Africa and the Swan River Colony in Australia, and in August 1833, 230 children were shipped to Toronto and New Brunswick in Canada.

The main pioneers of child migration in the nineteenth century were the Scottish Evangelical Christian Annie MacPherson, her sister Louisa Birt, and Londoner Maria Rye. Whilst working with poor children in London in the late 1860s, MacPherson was appalled by the child slavery of the matchbox industry and resolved to devote her life to these children. She bought a large warehouse in Spitalfields and turned it into the Home of Industry, where poor children could work and be fed and educated. The building was previously used by the Sisters of Mercy as a cholera hospital. It opened in 1868 and could hold up to two hundred children. She later became convinced that the real solution for these children lay in emigration to a country of opportunity and started an emigration fund. MacPherson began relocating children in 1870, departing for Canada on the twelfth of May with one hundred boys. Hastings County provided rent for a distribution centre in Belleville once she arrived. In the first year of the fund's operation, 500 children, trained in the London homes, were shipped to Canada. She shipped children from her own organisation and other agencies such as Barnardo's. MacPherson opened another receiving home in the town of Galt in Ontario and persuaded her sister, Louisa Birt, to open a third home in the village of Knowlton, 112 km from Montreal. MacPherson's other sister Mary, and her husband Joseph Merry, were superintendents of the Home of Industry for several years. They later ran the receiving home in Galt and its successor in Stratford. One of MacPherson's assistants at the Home of Industry went on to take charge of the Belleville home. This was the beginning of a massive operation which sought to find homes and careers for 14,000 of Britain's needy children. In 1887, the Home of Industry moved to purpose-built premises in Bethnal Green. The building was designed by Sir George Grenfell-Baines. MacPherson retired in 1902.

Maria Rye also worked amongst the poor in London and had arrived in Ontario with 68 children (50 of whom were from Liverpool) some months earlier than MacPherson, with the blessing of the Archbishop of Canterbury and The Times newspaper. Rye, who had been placing women emigrants in Canada since 1867, opened her home at Niagara-on-the-Lake in 1869, and by the turn of the century had settled some 5,000 children, mostly girls, in Ontario.

In 1909, South African-born Kingsley Fairbridge founded the "Society for the Furtherance of Child Emigration to the Colonies"  which was later incorporated as the Child Emigration Society. The purpose of the society, which later became the Fairbridge Foundation, was to educate orphaned and neglected children and train them in farming practices at farm schools located throughout the British Empire. Fairbridge emigrated to Australia in 1912, where his ideas received support and encouragement. According to the British House of Commons Child Migrant's Trust Report, "it is estimated that some 150,000 children were dispatched over a period of 350 years—the earliest recorded child migrants left Britain for the Virginia Colony in 1618, and the process did not finally end until the late 1960s." It was widely believed by contemporaries that all of these children were orphans, but it is now known that most had living parents, some of whom had no idea of the fate of their children after they were left in care homes, and some led to believe that their children had been adopted somewhere in Britain.

Child emigration was largely suspended for economic reasons during the Great Depression of the 1930s, but was not completely terminated until the 1970s.

As they were compulsorily shipped out of Britain, many of the children were deceived into believing their parents were dead, and that a more abundant life awaited them. Some were exploited as cheap agricultural labour, or denied proper shelter and education. It was common for Home Children to run away, sometimes finding a caring family or better working conditions.

Contemporary enquiries

The emigration schemes were not without their critics, and there were many rumours of ill-treatment of the children by their employers and of profiteering by the organisers of the schemes, particularly Maria Rye. In 1874 The London Board of Governors decided to send a representative, named Andrew Doyle, to Canada to visit the homes and the children to see how they were faring. Doyle's report praised the women and their staff, especially MacPherson, saying that they were inspired by the highest motives, but condemned almost everything else about the enterprise. He said that the attitude of the women in grouping together children from the workhouses, who he said were mostly of good reputation, with street children, whom he considered mostly thieves, was naive and had caused nothing but trouble in Canada. He was also critical of the checks made on the children after they were placed with settlers, which in Rye's case were mostly non-existent, and said that:

Because of Miss Rye's carelessness and Miss MacPherson's limited resources, thousands of British children, already in painful circumstances, were cast adrift to be overworked or mistreated by the settlers of early Canada who were generally honest but often hard taskmasters.

The House of Commons of Canada subsequently set up a select committee to examine Doyle's findings and there was much controversy generated by his report in Britain, but the schemes continued with some changes and were copied in other countries of the British Empire.

In 2014–2015 the Northern Ireland Historical Institutional Abuse Inquiry considered cases of children forcibly sent to Australia. They found that about 130 young children in the care of voluntary or state institutions were sent to Australia in what was described as the Child Migrant Programme in the period covered by the Inquiry, from 1922 to 1995, but mostly shortly after the Second World War.

Exposure and apologies 

In 1987 British social worker Margaret Humphreys carried out an investigation leading to the exposure of the child migration scheme and the establishment of the Child Migrants Trust, with the aim of reuniting parents and children. Full details of the scheme only emerged as late as 1998 during a parliamentary inquiry in Britain, which found that many migrant children were subjected to systematic abuse in religious schools in Australia, New Zealand and other countries.

In 1994 Humphreys published a book concerning her research entitled Empty Cradles.
In 2010, this book detailing Humphreys' work, political obstacles, and threats on her life along with the crimes and abuse done to thousands of children by government and religious officials was depicted in the film Oranges and Sunshine.

Australia
In Australia, Child Migrant children are the 7,000 children who migrated to Australia under assisted child migration schemes and form part of a larger group known as the Forgotten Australians; a term the Australian Senate has used to describe the estimated 500,000 children who were brought up in orphanages, children's homes, institutions, or foster care in Australia, up until the early 1990s. 

At the urging of the Care Leavers Australia Network, the Senate Community Affairs References Committee published in August 2001 Lost Innocents: Righting the Record—Report on child migration and followed this in August 2004 with the Forgotten Australians report. Both concluded with a number of recommendations, one of which was a call for a national apology. Instead, Prime Minister of Australia Kevin Rudd made an apology on 16 November 2009. The Australian government had contacted about 400 British Child Migrants for advice on how the apology should be delivered. Australia's Roman Catholic Church had publicly apologised in 2001 to British and Maltese child migrants who suffered abuse including rape, whippings, and slave labour in religious institutions. A £1 million travel fund was set up by the British government for former child migrants to visit their families in the UK. The Australian government later supplemented this fund.

Canada 
 The federal government designated the "Immigration of Home Children" a National Historic Event, in 1999. A plaque from the national Historic Sites and Monuments Board commemorating the event stands in Stratford, Ontario. The Ontario Heritage Trust erected a provincial historical plaque to the Home Children the year before, in Ottawa.

After the apology from the Australian Prime Minister, the Canadian Minister of Immigration, Refugees and Citizenship, Jason Kenney, said in 2009 that there was no need for the Canadian Crown-in-Council or -in-Parliament to apologise:

The Governor General of Canada proclaimed 2010 the "Year of the British Home Child" and, on 1 September 2010, Canada Post released a commemorative stamp to honour those who were sent to Canada. In the province of Ontario, the British Home Child Day Act, 2011, makes 28 September each year British Home Child Day to "recognize and honour the contributions of the British Home Children who established roots in Ontario."

United Kingdom 

Prime Minister Gordon Brown read, on 23 February 2010, an apology for the "shameful" child resettlement programme. He announced a £6 million fund designed to compensate the families affected by the "misguided" programme.

In 2020, it was reported that the Prince's Trust was providing funds to allow people sent as children from the UK to Australia by the Fairbridge Society to make claims for compensation for sexual and physical abuse. While Australia had a national redress scheme for people sexually abused as children in institutions, those sent by the Fairbridge Society were not eligible, as the Society no longer existed. The Prince's Trust had previously been criticised for "covering its backside" by denying it had knowledge of abuse suffered by Fairbridge Society child migrants.

Today 
Home Children Canada claimed in 2011 that one in ten Canadians is a descendant of a home child. The British government's Family Restoration Fund has arranged or reimbursed travel for more than a thousand child emigrants reuniting with their families. It is administered by the Child Migrants Trust and funded by the Department of Health and Social Care.

Media 
 Heaven on Earth, 1987 television film
 The Leaving of Liverpool: 1992 television mini-series
 Oranges and Sunshine: 2010 drama film
 Singer/songwriter released the song "Suitcase Full of Lies" in 2021 to accompany the History Detective Podcast Season 2 Episode 6: Child Migrants to Australia After WWII.
 Season 4, Episode 1 of the British television series Call the Midwife features a family of neglected children who are sent to Australia under the Child Migrant Programme.
 Season 12, Episode 11 of the Canadian television series Murdoch Mysteries, entitled 'Annabella Cinderella' is about a home child

See also

References 
Notes

Bibliography

Further reading 
 Oschefski, Lori "Bleating of the Lambs - Canada's British Home Children" 2015 Rose Printing 
 Boucher, Ellen. Empire's Children: Child Emigration, Welfare, and the Decline of the British World, 1869–1967 (2016) .
 Coldrey, Barry. "'A charity which has outlived its usefulness': the last phase of Catholic child migration, 1947–56." History of Education 25.4 (1996): 373–386.  https://dx.doi.org/10.1080/0046760960250406
 Doyle-Wood, Stan [2011]. A Trace of Genocide: https://tspace.library.utoronto.ca/bitstream/1807/31737/1/Doyle-Wood_Stanley_S_201109_PhD_thesis.pdf 
 
 
 
 
 
 Sherington, Geoffrey. "Contrasting narratives in the history of twentieth-century British child migration to Australia: An interpretive essay." History Australia 9.2 (2012): 27–47.
 Swain, Shurlee and Margot Hillel, eds. Child, Nation, Race and Empire: Child Rescue Discourse, England, Canada and Australia, 1850–1915 (2010). review

External links 
 British Home Children Advocacy & Research Association
 British Home Child Group International
 British Child Emigration Scheme to Canada
 British Home Children Descendants Site dedicated to the one million British Home Children Descendants
 Ontario Heritage Foundation plaque and background information
 Home Children (1869–1930) Search Database, Library and Archives Canada.
 Adoption & Forgotten Australians
 The Golden Bridge, an online exhibition created by the Institute for Research and Innovation in Social Services that tells the story of child migration to Canada from Scotland.
 British Parliament Health Committee Report, July 1998
 Child Migration – Legislative Provisions British Parliamentary Report Appendix
 Inside: Life Inside Children's Homes and Institutions, National Museum of Australia
 Inside: Life Inside Children's Homes and Institutions exhibition blog, National Museum of Australia
 Forgotten Australians: Our history – Australian Government website which includes oral histories, resources and photographs
 List of Child Migrant sent to Australia – History 
 Child Migrants Trust

Films 
 Heaven on Earth (1987) Canadian film (based on a true story) regarding 125,000 Welsh Home Children shipped to Canada
 The Leaving of Liverpool (1992) Australian film regarding UK children shipped to Australia following World War 2
 Oranges and Sunshine (2010) British-Australian co-production based on Margaret Humphreys' story.

Adoption history
Forced migration
History of immigration to Canada
Immigration to New Zealand
Immigration to South Africa
19th century in the British Empire
Social history of England
Social history of Scotland
Children's rights in England
Children's rights in Scotland
Scottish people of the British Empire
19th century in Canada
19th century in Australia
19th century in New Zealand
19th century in South Africa
20th century in Canada
Institutional abuse
 
 
 
 
International child abduction
1869 in the British Empire
Articles containing video clips
Settlement schemes in the British Empire
Immigration to Ontario